The Abbot of Tongland (later Commendator of Tongland) was the head of the Premonstratensian (originally Cistercian) monastic community of Tongland Abbey in the historical county of Kirkcudbrightshire in Dumfries and Galloway. The following is a list of abbots and commendators:

List of abbots
 Helias, 1209x1222
 Alexander, 1273-1296
 Walter, 1332-1347
 Gilbert, 1381
 Gilbert de Gamdia, 1439
 Gilbert MacDowell, 1458
 Patrick MacChaquhirky (or MacCathroge), 1458-x 1473
 William Douglas, 1473 x 1476-1479
 Thomas Livingston, 1479-1481
 William Wylie, x 1481
 Andrew Muirhead, 1481 -1483
 Damian de Falcutiis, 1504-1509

List of commendators
 David Arnot, 1509-1526
 William Stewart, 1529-1531
 Henry Wemyss, 1530-1541
 Andrew Dury, 1541-1558
 Alexander Gordon, 1559-1575
 Archibald Crawford, 1564
 John Gordon, 1576-1586
 Roger Gordon, 1578
 George Gordon, 1586-1588
 William Melville, 1588-1615

Notes

Bibliography
 Watt, D.E.R., Fasti Ecclesiae Scotinanae Medii Aevi ad annum 1638, 2nd Draft, (St Andrews, 1969)
 Watt, D.E.R. & Shead, N.F. (eds.), The Heads of Religious Houses in Scotland from the 12th to the 16th Centuries, The Scottish Records Society, New Series, Volume 24, (Edinburgh, 2001), p. 210-13

See also
 Tongland Abbey

Premonstratensians
Scottish abbots
Lists of abbots